This is a list of British children's and young adults' authors active between 1900 and 1949. The authors listed here are arranged by year of birth.

 Frances Hodgson Burnett (1849–1924)
 Mary Francis Ames (1853-1929)
 Mrs George de Horne Vaizey (1857–1917)
 E. Nesbit (1858–1924)
 Kenneth Grahame (1859–1932)
 J. M. Barrie (1860–1937)
 Herbert Hayens (1861-1944)
 Rudyard Kipling (1865–1936)
 Beatrix Potter (1866–1943)
 Angela Brazil (1868–1947)
 Percy F. Westerman (1876–1959)
 Frank Richards (1876–1961)
 Elsie J. Oxenham (1880–1960)
 Eleanor Farjeon (1881–1965)
 A. A. Milne (1882–1956)
 Arthur Ransome (1884–1967)
 Dorita Fairlie Bruce (1885–1970)
 Hugh Lofting (1886–1947)
 Ruth Manning-Sanders (1886–1988)
 Alison Uttley (1886–1976)
 Evadne Price (1888–1985)
 Richmal Crompton (1890–1969)
 J. R. R. Tolkien (1892–1973)
 W. E. Johns (1893–1968)
 Elinor Brent-Dyer (1894–1969)
 Enid Blyton (1894–1969)
 George Mills (1896–1972)
 Joyce Lankester Brisley (1896–1978)
 Dodie Smith (1896–1990)
 C. S. Lewis (1898–1963)
 John F. C. Westerman (1901–1991)
 Denys Watkins-Pitchford ("BB") (1905–1990)
 T. H. White (1906–1964)
 Mary Norton (1903–1992)
 Rev. W. Awdry (1911–1997)
 Roald Dahl (1916–1990)

See also
 List of British children's and young adults' literature titles (1900–1949)

 Authors
British children's literature 1900-1949